Me is an African television channel created and owned by M-Net, exclusive to their DStv satellite service.

History
The channel launched as The Series Channel on 1 April 1998. It then was explicitly branded with M-Net in 2005, becoming M-Net Series.

On 9 July 2013, the network became part of a three-network multiplex, with the other two channels, M-Net Series Reality, airing reality television, and M-Net Series Zone airing programmes on a delay. The network's new name, M-Net Series Showcase was meant to define it as M-Net's main network for debuting current series. However, the format failed within a year, and M-Net Series Showcase would become Vuzu Amp on 20 October 2014, while M-Net Edge took over for M-Net Series Reality on 13 October 2014.

M-Net City (2015 - 2021)
On 6 April 2015, the channel was rebranded as M-Net City #115. The channel number suffix was dropped in 2016.

Typically, M-Net City featured reruns of international programs airing on M-Net, M-Net Edge and Vuzu Amp/1Magic as well as some local South African shows from M-Net and Mzansi Magic.

Me (2021 - present)
On 1 October 2021, it was announced that M-Net City would simply rebrand to Me on 1 November 2021, merging with Vuzu.

M-Net City signed off the air at the end of 29 October 2021 for a two-day sizzle reel promoting the premiere of Me, along with Vuzu. Me then signed on at 4 p.m. three days later.

References 

Television stations in South Africa
English-language television stations in South Africa
Mass media in Johannesburg
M-Net
Television channels and stations established in 1998